Swartzia macrosema is a species of flowering plant in the family Fabaceae. It is found only in Ecuador. Its natural habitat is subtropical or tropical moist montane forests.

References

macrosema
Endangered plants
Trees of Ecuador
Trees of Peru
Taxonomy articles created by Polbot